Caeau means fields in Welsh and may refer to the following Sites of Special Scientific Interest in Wales:
Caeau Ardwyn
Caeau Blaen-bydernyn
Caeau Blaen-yr-Orfa
Caeau Blaenau-mawr
Caeau Capel Hendre
Caeau Cnwch a Ty'n-y-graig
Caeau Fferm
Caeau Ffos Fach
Caeau Bronydd-mawr
Caeau Cefn Cribwr
Caeau Crug Bychan, Ty Gwyn a Llwyn Ysgaw
Caeau Cwmcoynant (Caeau Cwncaenant)
Caeau Llety-cybi
Caeau Llwyn Gwrgan
Caeau Lotwen
Caeau Nant Garenig
Caeau Nant y Llechau
Caeau Nantsais
Caeau Pant-y-Bryn
Caeau Pen-y-coed
Caeau Rhyd-y-gwiail
Caeau Tir-mawr
Caeau Ty-mawr
Caeau Ty'n-llwyni
Caeau Ton-y-fildre